The Office of Digital Strategy (ODS) is an Executive Branch agency that  promotes the U.S. president's messaging through traditional and social media. It is part of the White House Office and is led by the assistant to the president and director of digital strategy, who reports to the White House Communications Director. The incumbent director is currently Rob Flaherty.

Role 
The office's primary role is to manage Whitehouse.gov and all non-personal social media platforms of the incumbent president and vice president including Facebook, Twitter, YouTube, Snapchat and Instagram.

Obama administration
Nate Lubin headed the office for part of president Barack Obama's tenure, Clay Dumas was the chief of staff for the Office of Digital Strategy, and Ashleigh Axios also worked in the office during Obama's presidency. Peter Welsch also had a role.

Trump administration
Ory Rinat was the chief digital officer for Donald Trump's administration. The Trump administration reworked the Whitehouse.gov website and manages various social media tools to communicate its messaging including Twitter.

Biden administration 
Rob Flaherty was appointed digital strategy director after serving on Joe Biden presidential campaign as digital director and as the digital director for the Presidential transition of Joe Biden. The Office of Social Media, headed by Dan Scavino during the Trump administration, was transitioned back to the Office of Digital Strategy.

References

External links
Section on whitehouse.gov

Executive Office of the President of the United States